W. Gordon Belser Arboretum is part of the University of South Carolina in Columbia, South Carolina, managed by the  Department of Biological Sciences. The arboretum serves as a nature preserve, field laboratory and research site for students and faculty. It is open to the public at a monthly open house. A small botanic garden features shrubs and small trees suitable for Columbia's home landscapes. The remaining landscape features southeast native trees and plant communities and is a certified Palmetto Wildlife Habitat. 

Topography within the approximately  arboretum changes dramatically. Dry sandy ridges slope into a ravine with bottomland hardwood forest and wetlands. Springs feed a bog and small creek. City storm drains replace natural drainage channels, and feed the arboretum's bald cypress swamp. Stormwater spreads out here, and water that does not infiltrate flows over a dam spillway, through the creek and over a waterfall into the stormwater system, eventually feeding Gills Creek. 

In 1959, William Gordon Belser gave the land to the University and stipulated its mission. But over decades the property became choked with invasive species and was unusable. A major restoration occurred from 2006 - 2016, led by UofSC professor Dr. Patricia DeCoursey, who marshaled thousands of university and community volunteers to perform the work. DeCoursey was recognized for her vision and effort to transform the arboretum in 2012, when she received South Carolina's Environmental Awareness Award. She stepped down in 2018, and Dr. Trey Franklin became director.

Arboretum native plant communities 
 Longleaf pine (Pinus palustris) and eastern wiregrass prairie
 Blight-resistant American chestnut (Castanea dentata)
 Upland oak-hickory deciduous forest
 Bottomland hardwood deciduous forest dominated by tulip tree, Liriodendron tulipifera
 American beech (Fagus grandifolia) and maple (Acer rubrum, A. leucoderme) forest
Bald cypress swamp (Taxodium distichum)
Atlantic white cypress bog (Chamaecyparis thyoides)
Southeast native Magnolia and Rhododendrons
Streetside display gardens of native and non-native azaleas and small flowering trees
Riparian and wetland communities
Trailside wildflower gardens

Public Visiting Information 
Visitors are invited to the free Open House the 3rd Sunday of every month from 1 - 4 p.m. Gates are open on Bloomwood and Wilmot Dr. 

Parking is available on both streets. Restrooms are not available. 

The mulched path is uneven and the terrain is hilly.

Pets are not permitted in the arboretum.

See also
 "USC's arboretum 'absolutely stunning'"
 Sherwood Forest Neighborhood
 Gills Creek Watershed Association
 List of botanical gardens and arboretums in South Carolina

References

External links
 
 W. Gordon Belser Arboretum on Plants Map

Arboreta in South Carolina
Botanical gardens in South Carolina
Geography of Columbia, South Carolina
Protected areas of Richland County, South Carolina
Tourist attractions in Columbia, South Carolina
University of South Carolina